Rosa de la Caridad Leal Armenteros (born 26 December 1996) is a Cuban handball player for La Habana and the Cuban national team.

She represented Cuba at the 2019 World Women's Handball Championship.

References

1996 births
Living people
Cuban female handball players
Handball players at the 2019 Pan American Games
Pan American Games medalists in handball
Pan American Games bronze medalists for Cuba
Medalists at the 2019 Pan American Games
21st-century Cuban women